Senate elections were held in Turkey on 2 June 1968. In this election 53 members of the senate were elected; 50 members for one-third of the senate and three vacant seats.

Results

References

Turkey
Turkey
Senate
Senate elections in Turkey